Ceramornis is a prehistoric bird genus from the Late Cretaceous. It lived shortly before the Cretaceous–Paleogene extinction event in the Maastrichtian, some  Its remains were found in the Lull 2 location, a Lance Formation site in Niobrara County, Wyoming (United States). A single species is known, Ceramornis major, and even that only from a proximal piece of coracoid. This is specimen UCMP V53957, which was collected by a University of California team in 1958.

Ceramornis has been placed in the charadriiform family Cimolopterygidae, together with  Cimolopteryx and Lamarqueavis. This placement was based on quantitative analysis of its coracoid and comparison with other neornithine samples. However, there remains some uncertainty about the taxonomic position, as there is insufficient fossil material to be assessed by wide-scale cladistic analysis. 

It is not certain that this clade was already distinct by the Maastrichtian.

References

Fossil taxa described in 1963
Late Cretaceous birds of North America
Prehistoric bird genera
Prehistoric ornithurans